Nathan Bennett (born January 19, 1984) is a former American football guard. He was signed by the Cleveland Browns as an undrafted free agent in 2008. He played college football at Clemson.

Bennett was also a member of the Baltimore Ravens, Atlanta Falcons, New Orleans Saints, Hartford Colonials and Milwaukee Mustangs.

External links
Clemson Tigers bio
Just Sports Stats

1984 births
Living people
Players of American football from Georgia (U.S. state)
Sportspeople from the Atlanta metropolitan area
American football offensive guards
Clemson Tigers football players
Cleveland Browns players
Baltimore Ravens players
Atlanta Falcons players
New Orleans Saints players
New York Sentinels players
Hartford Colonials players
Milwaukee Mustangs (2009–2012) players
People from Dallas, Georgia